Peptide-methionine (S)-S-oxide reductase (MsrA, methionine sulphoxide reductase A, methionine S-oxide reductase (S-form oxidizing), methionine sulfoxide reductase A, peptide methionine sulfoxide reductase, formerly protein-methionine-S-oxide reductase) is an enzyme with systematic name peptide-L-methionine:thioredoxin-disulfide S-oxidoreductase (L-methionine (S)-S-oxide-forming). This enzyme catalyses the following chemical reaction

 (1) peptide-L-methionine + thioredoxin disulfide + H2O  peptide-L-methionine (S)-S-oxide + thioredoxin
 (2) L-methionine + thioredoxin disulfide + H2O  L-methionine (S)-S-oxide + thioredoxin

The reaction occurs in the reverse direction.

References

External links 
 

EC 1.8.4